Shepard is an extinct town in Iron County, in the U.S. state of Missouri.

A post office called Shepard was established in 1913, and remained in operation until 1929. The community has the name of Elihu H. Shepard, an early settler.

References

Ghost towns in Missouri
Former populated places in Iron County, Missouri